NADH dehydrogenase [ubiquinone] iron-sulfur protein 5 is an enzyme that in humans is encoded by the NDUFS5 gene.

References

Further reading

Human proteins